Convector may refer to:

 Convector (mythology), a Roman god
 Convector heater, a type of heating and cooling element
 Convection oven, a type of oven